GA-binding protein alpha chain is a protein that in humans is encoded by the GABPA gene.

Function 

This gene encodes one of three GA-binding protein transcription factor subunits which functions as a DNA-binding subunit.  Since this subunit shares identity with a subunit encoding the nuclear respiratory factor 2 gene, it is likely involved in activation of cytochrome oxidase expression and nuclear control of mitochondrial function.  This subunit also shares identity with a subunit constituting the transcription factor E4TF1, responsible for expression of the adenovirus E4 gene.  Because of its chromosomal localization and ability to form heterodimers with other polypeptides, this gene may play a role in the Down Syndrome phenotype.

Interactions 

GABPA has been shown to interact with Host cell factor C1, Sp1 transcription factor and Sp3 transcription factor.

References

Further reading

External links 
 

Transcription factors